Yoveinny Deteri Mota Aranguren (born 20 June 2000) is a Venezuelan athlete competing in the sprint hurdles. She represented her country at the 2022 World Indoor Championships finishing fifth.

Her personal bests are 12.95 seconds in the 100 metres hurdles (+0.9 m/s, Baton Rouge 2021) and 7.99 seconds in the 60 metres hurdles (Belgrade 2022). Both are current national records.

International competitions

1Disqualified in the final

References

2000 births
Living people
Venezuelan female hurdlers
Athletes (track and field) at the 2019 Pan American Games
21st-century Venezuelan women